XHMC-FM is a commercial radio station located in Mexicali, Baja California, Mexico, broadcasting to the Valley of Mexicali, and Imperial Valley, California, area of the United States on 104.9 FM. XHMC-FM airs a contemporary hit radio music format branded as @FM (Arroba FM).

History
XHMC received its concession on November 10, 1987. It was owned by Rosa Ruíz de Reyes and has been operated by Radiorama for most of its history.

Until late 2013 it was known as Estéreo Vida with a Spanish Adult Contemporary rebranding to "Vida 104.9", in 2014 became pop format as "Juventud 104.9", Vida moved to XHSOL-FM, and in 2015 to @FM (Arroba FM).

In 2017, control of the Radiorama Mexicali cluster was transferred to Grupo Larsa Comunicaciones, marking its first expansion outside of the state of Sonora. On December 1, XHMC was relaunched as "Arroba Sin Límites", retaining the name of its previous pop format (Arroba FM/@FM) while adding that used on Larsa's other similarly formatted stations. By 2018 Radiorama returns back operation and resumed returned to the @FM (Arroba FM) format.

References

Contemporary hit radio stations in Mexico
Grupo Radiorama
Radio stations established in 1984
Radio stations in Mexicali
Spanish-language radio stations
Mass media in Mexicali